is a Japanese kickboxer, currently competing in the atomweight division of RISE, where she is the incumbent atomweight champion.

As of October 2022, she is ranked as the eighth best pound-for-pound women's kickboxer in the world by Beyond Kick.

Kickboxing career

Early career
Miyazaki made her professional debut against Kira Matsutani at the inaugural RISE GIRLS POWER event, held on November 8, 2019. The fight was ruled a draw by split decision after three rounds. One judge scored the bout 30–29 for Miyazaki, the second scored it 30–28 for Matsutani, while the third judge scored it an event 29–29 draw.

Miyazaki was booked to face the undefeated Karen at KNOCK OUT CHAMPIONSHIP 2 on September 13, 2020. She won the fight by unanimous decision.

RISE Atomweight champion

Next Challenger tournament
On December 24, 2020, it was revealed that RISE would hold an atomweight "Next Challenger" tournament, in order to determine the next challenger for the RISE Women's Atomweight championship, which was held at the time by Momi Furuta. Miyazaki was booked to face Reina Sato in the tournament semifinals, held at RISE Girls Power 4 on January 17, 2021, while the other semifinals saw Arina Kobayashi face Nana Okuwaki. Miyazaki beat Sato by unanimous decision, with scores of 30–29, 30–28 and 30–27. Miyazaki advanced to the finals of the one-day tournament, where she faced Arina Kobayashi. She won the fight by unanimous decision. Two of the judges scored the fight 30–28 in her favor, while the third judge scored it 30–29 for Miyazaki.

Miyazaki was booked to challenge the reigning atomweight champion Momi Furuta at RISE 147 on March 28, 2021. She won the fight by a narrow majority decision. Two of the judges awarded her a 49–48 scorecard, while the third judge scored the bout as an even 48–48 draw.

Title reign
Miyazaki faced the incumbent WMC World Mini Flyweight and Battle of Muay Thai Pinweight titleholder Saya Ito in a non-title bout at RISE GIRLS POWER 5 on September 12, 2021. The fight was ruled a split decision draw after the first three rounds were contested, with Miyazaki winning the majority decision after an extra round was fought.

Miyazaki faced the former former NJKF Minerva atomweight champion Momoka at RISE 155 on February 23, 2022. She won the fight by unanimous decision.

Miyazaki was scheduled to defend her RISE Atomweight title against Arina Kobayashi at RISE 158 on May, 29, 2022. She won the fight by unanimous decision, with scores of 50–47, 50–46 and 50–46.

Miyazaki faced Petloolaon Sarigym in a non-title bout at RISE World Series 2022 on October 15, 2022. She won the fight by unanimous decision, with scores of 30–29, 30–29 and 30–28.

Miyazaki faced the Shootboxing Japan atomweight champion MISAKI in a non-title bout at RISE WORLD SERIES / SHOOTBOXING-KINGS on December 25, 2022. She won the fight by majority decision, with scores of 30–29, 30–28 and 29–29.

Miyazaki faced Byun Bo-Kyeong in a -47.5 kg catchweight bout at RISE ELDORADO 2023 on March 26, 2023.

Championships and accomplishments

Kickboxing
Professional
RISE
 2021 RISE Next Challenger Tournament Winner
 2021 RISE Queen Atomweight Championship
One successful title defense

Amateur
 2019 RISE NOVA All Japan Tournament -47kg Champion

Awards
eFight.jp
Fighter of the Month (March 2021)

Karate
 2013 Karate Battle Kings Elementary School Championship Runner-up
 2014 JIKA All Japan Junior Championship Third Place
 2015 Kanegawa Karate Middleschool Championship Runner-up
 2015 IKO World So-Kyokushin All Japan Jr. Middle School Championship Third Place
 2016 Seishin Kaikan All Kanto Middle School Lightweight Championship 
 2016 Byakuren Kaikan All Kanto Middle School –50kg Championship 
 2016 IKO World So-Kyokushin All Japan Jr. Middle School Lightweight Championship 
 2016 IKO World So-Kyokushin All Japan Middle School Lightweight Championship
 2016 JIKA All Japan Middle School Lightweight Championship Runner-up
 2017 Kanegawa Karate Middleschool Lightweight Championship
 2017 East Japan Junior Full Contact Middle School Lightweight Championship
 2017 JIKA All Japan Middle School Lightweight Championship 
 2017 All Japan Jr. Karate Real Championship Middle School –50kg Championship 
 2017 JIKA All Japan Junior Lightweight Championship Runner-up
 2017 IKO World So-Kyokushin All Japan Jr. Middle School Lightweight Championship Runner-up
 2018 IKO World So-Kyokushin All Kanto Middle School Lightweight Championship
 2018 Kanegawa Karate Middleschool Lightweight Championship
 2018 WKO Japan Athlete Cup Middle School -50kg Championship

Fight record

|-  style="text-align:center; background:#"
| 2023-03-26 || ||align=left| Byun Bo-Kyeong || RISE ELDORADO 2023 || Tokyo, Japan ||  || ||
|-
|-  style="background:#cfc;"
| 2022-12-25|| Win ||align=left| MISAKI || RISE WORLD SERIES / SHOOTBOXING-KINGS|| Tokyo, Japan || Decision (Majority) || 3 ||3:00
|-
|- style="text-align:center; background:#cfc"
| 2021-10-15 || Win ||style="text-align:left"| Petlookaon Sarigym || RISE World Series 2022 || Tokyo, Japan ||  Decision (Unanimous) || 3|| 3:00 
|-
|- style="text-align:center; background:#cfc"
| 2022-05-29|| Win ||style="text-align:left"| Arina Kobayashi || RISE 158 || Tokyo, Japan || Decision (Unanimous) || 5|| 3:00
|-
! style=background:white colspan=9 |

|-  style="text-align:center; background:#cfc"
| 2022-02-23 || Win ||style="text-align:left"| Momoka || RISE 155|| Tokyo, Japan || Decision (Unanimous) || 3 || 3:00

|-  style="text-align:center; background:#cfc"
| 2021-09-12 || Win ||style="text-align:left"| Saya Ito || RISE GIRLS POWER 5|| Tokyo, Japan || Ext.R Decision (Majority) || 4 || 3:00

|- style="text-align:center; background:#cfc"
| 2021-03-28|| Win ||style="text-align:left"| Momi || RISE 147 || Tokyo, Japan || Decision (Majority) || 5 || 3:00
|-
! style=background:white colspan=9 |

|- style="text-align:center; background:#cfc"
| 2021-01-17|| Win ||style="text-align:left"| Arina Kobayashi|| RISE Girls Power 4, Next Challenger Tournament Final || Tokyo, Japan || Decision (Unanimous) ||  3||3:00

|- style="text-align:center; background:#cfc"
| 2021-01-17|| Win ||style="text-align:left"| Reina Sato|| RISE Girls Power 4, Next Challenger Tournament Semi Final || Tokyo, Japan || Decision (Unanimous) ||  3||3:00

|- style="text-align:center; background:#fbb"
| 2020-11-01|| Loss ||style="text-align:left"| Ayaka|| RISE DEAD OR ALIVE 2020 Osaka || Osaka, Japan || Decision (Unanimous) ||  3||3:00

|- style="text-align:center; background:#cfc"
| 2020-10-11|| Win ||style="text-align:left"| Arina Kobayashi|| RISE DEAD OR ALIVE 2020 Yokohama || Yokohama, Japan || Decision (Unanimous) ||  3||3:00

|- style="text-align:center; background:#cfc"
| 2020-09-13|| Win ||style="text-align:left"| Karen || KNOCK OUT CHAMPIONSHIP 2 || Tokyo, Japan || Decision (Unanimous) ||  3||3:00

|- style="text-align:center; background:#c5d2ea"
| 2019-11-08|| Draw||style="text-align:left"| Kira Matsutani|| RISE GIRLS POWER || Tokyo, Japan || Decision ||  3||3:00
|-
| colspan=9 | Legend:    

|-  style="text-align:center; background:#cfc;"
| 2019-08-04|| Win||style="text-align:left"| Honoka Kobayashi || RISE NOVA All Japan Tournament, Final || Tokyo, Japan || Decision (Split)  || 1 || 2:00  
|-
! style=background:white colspan=9 |

|-  style="text-align:center; background:#cfc;"
| 2019-08-04|| Win||style="text-align:left"| Hikari Kushida || RISE NOVA All Japan Tournament, Semi Final || Tokyo, Japan || Decision (Unanimous) || 1 || 2:00  

|-  style="text-align:center; background:#cfc;"
| 2019-08-04|| Win||style="text-align:left"| Hitomi Kurihara || RISE NOVA All Japan Tournament, Quarter Final || Tokyo, Japan || Decision (Unanimous) || 1 || 2:00  

|-  style="text-align:center; background:#cfc;"
| 2019-06-02|| Win||style="text-align:left"| Nana Kikuchihara || KAMINARIMON || Tokyo, Japan || TKO  || 1 ||  

|-  style="text-align:center; background:#cfc;"
| 2018-10-21|| Win||style="text-align:left"| Kanoko Igarashi || KAMINARIMON || Tokyo, Japan || Decision (Unanimous)  || 2 || 1:30 

|-
| colspan=9 | Legend:

See also
 List of female kickboxers

References 

2003 births
Living people
Japanese kickboxers
Japanese female kickboxers
Sportspeople from Tokyo
Kyokushin kaikan practitioners
Kickboxing champions